The Evarts-class destroyer escorts were destroyer escorts launched in the United States in 1942–44. They served in World War II as convoy escorts and anti-submarine warfare ships. They were also known as the GMT or "short hull" DE class, with GMT standing for General Motors Tandem Diesel drive.

The first ship to be completed was commissioned on 20 January 1943 at the Boston Navy Yard; it was delivered to the Royal Navy under the Lend-Lease provisions and became . Evarts-class ships were driven by diesel-electric power with four diesel engines mounted in tandem with electric drives. The ships were prefabricated in sections at various factories in the United States and the units brought together in the shipyards, where they were welded together on the slipways. The original design specified eight engines for 24 knots but other priority programs forced the use of only four with a consequent shortening of the hull.

In all, 105 Evarts-class ships were ordered with 8 later being cancelled. The United States Navy commissioned 65 while 32 Evarts-class ships were delivered to the Royal Navy.

Ships in Class

See also
 List of destroyer escorts of the United States Navy
 List of frigates of the United States Navy subset of above with hull numbers DE/FF 1037 and higher plus all DEG/FFGs because of the United States Navy 1975 ship reclassification
 List of frigates

References

External links

 Destroyer Escort Sailors Association (DESA)
 USS Slater, the Destroyer Escort Historical Museum
 Captain Class Frigates Association
 uboat.net

Frigate classes